Patrick Hahn (born 17 July 1995 in Graz) is an Austrian conductor, pianist and composer.

Biography
Hahn began his musical education as a treble soloist with the Graz Boys Choir and led him at age 11 to study piano at the University of Music and Performing Arts Graz, where he also completed his studies in conducting and correpetition. His family comes from a non-musical background.  He has taken part in Masterclasses with Kurt Masur and Bernard Haitink and was a Conducting Fellow at both the Aspen Music Festival as well as the Tanglewood Music Center.

Hahn gave his professional debut as a conductor in 2014 with the Orchestra of the Hungarian State Opera in Budapest sharing the stage with Piotr Beczała and Ferruccio Furlanetto at a gala concert on the occasion of the 25th anniversary of the opening of the Austrian-Hungarian border.  With a performance of Bruckner's Symphony No. 7 by the Hamburg Symphony Orchestra in the spring of 2019, Hahn became the youngest conductor in the large hall of the Elbphilharmonie Hamburg. His Japanese debut took place in the summer of 2019 on tour with the Orchestra Ensemble Kanazawa and Japanese pianist Nobuyuki Tsujii as well as French trumpeter Lucienne Renaudin Vary. Within the field of contemporary music he has a close relationship with Klangforum Wien.

As a pianist, he performed with the Mozarteum Orchestra Salzburg or as a Lied accompanist in the Vienna Musikverein, for the season 2017/18 he was also a repetiteur at the Hamburg State Opera.  He served as assistant conductor to Kirill Petrenko for the 2019 new productions of Salome and Die Tote Stadt at the Bavarian State Opera, as well as Fidelio at Festspielhaus Baden-Baden.

With the 2021-2022 season, Hahn became Generalmusikdirektor (GMD) of the Wuppertaler Bühnen und Sinfonieorchester GmbH, then the youngest GMD in Germany.  Hahn also became principal guest conductor of the Munich Radio Orchestra, the first such titled conductor in the orchestra's history.  He currently serves as principal guest conductor and artistic advisor of the Borusan Istanbul Philharmonic Orchestra, and is scheduled to stand down from this post at the close of the 2022-2023 season.  In December 2022, the Wuppertaler Bühnen und Sinfonieorchester GmbH announced the extension of his initial 3-year contract for an additional two years, through the 2025-2026 season.

Other activities
Continuous contact with the field of opera as a treble soloist led him to write his first composition at the age of 12 - the opera "Die Frittatensuppe", which was premiered in 2008 under his direction in Graz. In 2013 he was awarded the 2nd prize at the Penfield Music Commission Project Contest (New York, USA). As a composer and arranger he has published music with Tierolff Muziekcentrale (Roosendaal, the Netherlands) as well as Helbling (Rum/Innsbruck).

Aside from his work in classical music, Hahn has a keen interest in both cabaret-songs by the Austrian satirist and composer Georg Kreisler as well as in jazz music, having received awards as a pianist at jazz festivals in Chicago and the "Outstanding Soloist Award" from the University of Wisconsin-La Crosse as the best jazz pianist of its 37th Annual Jazz Festival.

References

External links
 Official homepage of Patrick Hahn
 HarrisonParrott artists' agency page on Patrick Hahn

Austrian conductors (music)
1995 births
Living people
Austrian male composers
21st-century pianists
Austrian pianists
Musicians from Graz
21st-century male musicians
21st-century composers
Male pianists
University of Music and Performing Arts Graz alumni